The Southern Land, Known is a book authored by Gabriel de Foigny in 1676. The story is about Jacques Sadeur, from his birth to the departures from terre Australe. In this book, Foigny utilizes Utopia to describe an egalitarian society without government and people without the need of religion.

References

1676 books
17th-century French novels